Trade Unions and Industrialists – Union of Labour (Profsoyuzi – Promishlenniki Rossii – Soyuz Truda) was a political party in Russia.

History
In the 1995 parliamentary elections the party received 1.6% of the proportional representation vote, failing to cross the electoral threshold. However, it won a single constituency seat in the State Duma.

The party did not contest any further elections.

References

Defunct political parties in Russia
Political parties with year of establishment missing
Political parties with year of disestablishment missing